Dilson Darío Torres (born May 31, 1970) is a former Venezuelan pitcher in Major League Baseball who played for the Kansas City Royals in their 1995 season. Listed at 6' 3", 200 lb., Torres batted and threw right-handed. He was born in Maracay, Aragua.

See also
 List of players from Venezuela in Major League Baseball

External links
, or Retrosheet, or The Baseball Gauge, or Venezuela Winter League

1970 births
Living people
Cardenales de Lara players
Kansas City Royals players
Leones del Caracas players
Major League Baseball pitchers
Major League Baseball players from Venezuela
Memphis Chicks players
Omaha Royals players
Sportspeople from Maracay
St. Catharines Blue Jays players
Tiburones de La Guaira players
Venezuelan expatriate baseball players in the United States
Wichita Wranglers players
Wilmington Blue Rocks players
Mercuries Tigers players
Venezuelan expatriate baseball players in Taiwan
Venezuelan expatriate baseball players in Canada